Stardust is an album by saxophonist/composer Benny Golson featuring trumpeter Freddie Hubbard that was recorded in 1987 and originally released on the Japanese Denon label. The album was reissued on the LRC label in 2006.

Reception

The AllMusic review by Scott Yanow said "Hubbard was in prime form during this period, and the repertoire provides inspiration for some excellent hard bop-oriented solos. Worth searching for.".

Track listing 
All compositions by Benny Golson except where noted
 "Stardust" (Hoagy Carmichael, Mitchell Parish) – 9:18
 "Double Bass" (Ron Carter) – 9:20
 "Gipsy Jingle-Jangle" – 4:41
 "Povo" (Freddie Hubbard) – 12:13
 "Love Is a Many Splendored Thing" (Sammy Fain, Paul Francis Webster) – 7:29
 "Sad to Say" – 10:16 Additional track on CD release
 "Far Away" (Hubbard) – 13:46 Additional track on CD release

Personnel 
Benny Golson – tenor saxophone
Freddie Hubbard – trumpet, flugelhorn
Mulgrew Miller – piano
Ron Carter - bass 
Marvin "Smitty" Smith – drums

Production
Tatsunori Konno – producer
Ed Rak – engineer

References 

Benny Golson albums
Freddie Hubbard albums
1987 albums
Denon Records albums